The 2018 European Modern Pentathlon Championships was held in Székesfehérvár, Hungary from 17 to 23 July 2018.

Medal summary

Men's events

Women's events

Mixed events

Medal table

References

European Modern Pentathlon Championships
European Modern Pentathlon Championships
European Modern Pentathlon Championships
International sports competitions hosted by Hungary
July 2018 sports events in Europe